Tasha St. Louis (born 20 December 1983) is a Trinidadian footballer who plays as a midfielder. She has been a member of the Trinidad and Tobago women's national team, of which she is the top scorer of all time.

International goals
Scores and results list Trinidad and Tobago' goal tally first.

External links 
 

1983 births
Living people
Women's association football midfielders
Trinidad and Tobago women's footballers
Trinidad and Tobago women's international footballers
Pan American Games competitors for Trinidad and Tobago
Footballers at the 2011 Pan American Games
Footballers at the 2015 Pan American Games
Competitors at the 2010 Central American and Caribbean Games
Competitors at the 2018 Central American and Caribbean Games
New England Mutiny players
Damallsvenskan players
Sunnanå SK players
Trinidad and Tobago expatriate women's footballers
Trinidad and Tobago expatriate sportspeople in the United States
Expatriate women's soccer players in the United States
Trinidad and Tobago expatriate sportspeople in Sweden
Expatriate women's footballers in Sweden